Varshakonda is a village in the Jagityal district of Telangana, India. It follows a panchayat form of government, where Sarpanch is the head of the village.

References 

Villages in Jagtial district